Constantin Gheară (born Constanța, 2 September 1981) is a Romanian rugby union player. He plays as a wing.

Gheară plays for Farul Constanța, in the Romanian Rugby Championship.

He has 18 caps for Romania, from 2004 to 2012, with 1 try scored, 5 points on aggregate. He was called for the 2011 Rugby World Cup, playing in two games, one as a substitute, but without scoring. He has been absent from the National Team since 2012.

References

External links

1981 births
Living people
Romanian rugby union players
Rugby union wings
Romania international rugby union players
Sportspeople from Constanța